Ville Nousiainen (born 5 December 1983, in Kouvola) is a Finnish cross-country skier who has been competing since 2002. He finished fifth in the 4 × 10 km relay at the 2010 Winter Olympics in Vancouver, Canada.

Nousiainen won his first world championship medal with a bronze in the team sprint event with Sami Jauhojärvi at Liberec in 2009. He then followed it with another bronze in the 4 × 10 km relay at the same championships.

First place victories include two 10 km FIS races and most recently two National Championships in Finland in 2010 (50 km, 19.8 km).

Ville Nousiainen was married to Mona-Liisa Nousiainen from 2015 until her death in 2019. They have one daughter.

Cross-country skiing results
All results are sourced from the International Ski Federation (FIS).

Olympic Games

World Championships
 2 medals – (2 bronze)

World Cup

Season standings

Individual podiums

2 podiums

Team podiums

1 podium

References

External links
 
 
 

1983 births
Living people
People from Kouvola
Cross-country skiers at the 2006 Winter Olympics
Cross-country skiers at the 2010 Winter Olympics
Cross-country skiers at the 2014 Winter Olympics
Finnish male cross-country skiers
Tour de Ski skiers
Olympic cross-country skiers of Finland
FIS Nordic World Ski Championships medalists in cross-country skiing
Sportspeople from Kymenlaakso